Daniel Percival is a British director and screenwriter of television drama. His work has won BAFTAs.

Career
Having originally trained as a film editor Percival started directing documentaries for the BBC in the mid 1990s. One of his earliest successes was a two-part series about depression for Channel 4 in England, New Britain on the Couch, presented by psychologist Oliver James, as well as Ancient Inventions.

Percival would transition into drama work over the 2000s. writing on Waking the Dead and co-writing and directing the political thriller The State Within. The series,  a joint production between BBC Films and BBC America, follows Sir Mark Brydon (Jason Isaacs), the British Ambassador to Washington, who is caught in the centre of a political conspiracy threatening to depose Western governments. As such, he must prevent a war, all whilst facing his own personal dilemmas.  The series was nominated for two Golden Globe Awards in the categories 'Best Mini-Series or Motion Picture Made for Television' and 'Best Actor - Miniseries or Television Film'. Other work includes Death Comes to Pemberley and Jimmy McGovern's Banished, and several Frank Spotnitz productions, such as Chris Ryan's Strike Back, Crossing Lines, Hunted and Leonardo.

References

External links
 

21st-century British male writers
British television writers
British male screenwriters
British television directors
Year of birth missing (living people)
Living people